Thomas Russell Craddick (born September 19, 1943) is a Republican member of the Texas House of Representatives representing the 82nd district. Craddick was Speaker of the Texas House of Representatives from January 2003 to January 2009. He was the first Republican to have served as Speaker since Reconstruction.

Craddick was first elected in 1968 at the age of twenty-five and, as of 2019, is now the longest serving legislator in the history of the Texas House of Representatives and the longest serving incumbent state legislator in the United States. In November 2021, Craddick announced he would run in the 2022 general election for a twenty-eighth term.

Early life and career

Craddick was born in Beloit, Wisconsin where he lived until he was nine years old. He became an Eagle Scout.

Texas House of Representatives
While he was a doctoral student at Texas Tech University in Lubbock, Craddick decided to run for the legislature to succeed the incumbent Republican Frank Kell Cahoon of Midland, who was not seeking a third two-year term. According to Craddick's official biography, even his father, businessman R.F. Craddick (1913–1986), warned him: "Texas is run by Democrats. You can't win."  Although this part of Texas had been trending Republican at the national level for some time (for instance, Midland itself has not voted for a Democratic presidential candidate since 1948), Democrats continued to hold most local offices well into the 1980s.

He was one of eight Republicans in the chamber at that time. His victory came on the same day that Richard M. Nixon was elected as U.S. President.

In 1975, Craddick was named chairman of the House Natural Resources Committee, the first Republican to have chaired a Texas legislative committee in more than a century. In Texas, a legislator need not be in the majority party in order to chair a committee.

In the general election held on November 6, 2018, Craddick won his 26th term in the legislature. With 37,504 votes (80.3 percent), he defeated the Democratic candidate, Spencer Bounds, who polled 9,207 votes (19.7 percent). In this same election, Craddick's daughter, Christi Craddick, won her second term as a Republican member of the Texas Railroad Commission.

Speaker of the House
On January 11, 2003, after thirty-four years in the House, Craddick became the first Republican Speaker in more than 130 years. He held the presiding officer's position for six years.

In December 2006, Craddick faced credible challenges to his re-election as Speaker for the Eightieth Texas Legislature: Brian McCall (R-Plano), Jim Pitts (R-Waxahachie), and Senfronia Thompson (D-Houston), all of whom announced candidacies for the speakership. In early January, McCall withdrew and endorsed Pitts. 
Supporters of Pitts pressed for a secret ballot in order to avoid retribution should their efforts fail, 
while Craddick had maintained all along that he had more than the minimum number of votes needed for re-election. 
When the secret ballot measure failed, Pitts withdrew, and Craddick was re-elected to a third term as Speaker on January 9, 2007, by a vote of 121-27.

Ouster as Speaker
Craddick became increasingly unpopular with not only Democrats but those of his own party, and many called for a new Speaker to be elected. In the most extreme case, Craddick's political views and leadership compelled Kirk England (R-Grand Prairie) to run for re-election as a Democrat in the 2008 Texas Legislature elections.

Chaos erupted in the Texas House of Representatives on Friday, May 25, 2007, when Fred Hill, a Republican from Richardson, attempted to raise a question of privilege to remove Craddick from office, but Craddick refused to allow him to raise the question.  The attempts to oust Craddick continued through the weekend as other Republicans made additional motions, which were also disallowed for a time, although ultimately successful.

Craddick's close allies, such as Representative Phil King of Weatherford, said that the actions against the Speaker were an effort by Democrats to gain control of the legislature before the legislative and congressional redistricting process of 2011. However, then Representative Byron Cook, a departing Republican from Corsicana, said that the fight was about Craddick having consolidated power with lobbyists and having used campaign contributions to maintain control in the House: "This is about the convergence of money and power and influence," Cook said.

Specifically, Craddick recessed the legislature for two and a half hours after Representatives attempted to gain recognition to put the question of Craddick's removal to a vote. When Hill asked to vote to remove Mr. Craddick, the Speaker replied: "The Speaker's power of recognition on any matter cannot be appealed."

His parliamentarian, Denise Davis disagreed, stating that question of privilege relating to the removal of a Speaker from office is such a highly privileged one that even the leader may not refuse. When Craddick shunned her advice, Davis and her assistant, Chris Griesel, resigned. Craddick immediately hired former Representative Terry Keel of Austin to the post as well as former Representative (and present-day lawyer) Ron Wilson as Keel's assistant.  The session resumed until 1 a.m. and despite further protests from members of the legislature, Craddick remained in his position as Speaker, and the session was recessed.

In January 2009, Craddick was ousted as Speaker after nearly the entire Democratic Caucus and a number of Republicans broke ranks to vote for  Joe Straus, a two-term moderate Republican from San Antonio. Straus remained speaker until his retirement from the House in January 2019. The last Texas House Speaker to be removed had also been a Republican, Ira Hobart Evans, who was rejected in 1871 for cooperating with Democrats on an elections bill. Craddick won reelection to his House seat in the general election on November 2, 2010. Straus then won a second term as Speaker in January 2011, defeating two challengers.

Personal life
Thomas Craddick is married to the former Nadine Nayfa, a native of Sweetwater in west Texas. She is of Lebanese descent. In addition to their daughter, Christi, they have a son, Thomas, Jr., and a grandson, Thomas Russell Craddick, III. Craddick holds BBA and MBA degrees from the Rawls College of Business at Texas Tech. He lists his occupation as a sales representative for Mustang Mud, an oilfield supply company, although he also is a real estate speculator and developer.

On November 6, 2012, when Craddick won his 23rd term in the Texas House, his daughter Christi was easily elected as a Republican to the Texas Railroad Commission, the state's oil and gas regulatory body.

See also
 2003 Texas redistricting

Notes

|-

|-

|-

|-

1943 births
People from Midland, Texas
Politicians from Beloit, Wisconsin
Living people
Speakers of the Texas House of Representatives
Republican Party members of the Texas House of Representatives
Midland High School (Midland, Texas) alumni
Rawls College of Business alumni
American real estate businesspeople
21st-century American politicians